Judy Devlin (later Judy Hashman) (born 22 October 1935 in Winnipeg, Manitoba) is a former badminton player who won more major international titles than any other player of her era.

Devlin began playing badminton with her Irish-born father Frank Devlin when she was seven in the Baltimore, Maryland region of the U.S.A. where her family had settled. Under her father's tutelage she developed a badminton game notable for its power, accuracy, and consistency. After dominating U.S. junior competition she won her first (adult) U.S. championship event, women's doubles, with her older sister Susan Devlin in 1953. This marked the beginning of the run of success listed below.  She married Dick Hashman in 1960, living in England thereafter and eventually becoming a British citizen.

Career
Competing before the establishment of an official world championships for individual players and before badminton's entry into the Olympic Games, Devlin won 86 national and international titles. Among these are 31 titles in the USA, 8 titles in Germany, 7 titles in Canada, 4 titles in the Netherlands, 4 titles in Sweden, 3 titles in Ireland, 3 titles in Jamaica, 2 titles in Scotland, and a combined 19 titles in All England Open and English National competition. She played on U.S. Uber Cup teams that won three successive world championships (1957, 1960, 1963). In 1972 she won 2 titles (team and women's doubles) at the European Badminton Championships. She retired in 1973.

From 1954 to 1967 Devlin dominated the women's singles event at the U.S. Open, winning 12 titles in 14 years, including 8 consecutive championships from 1956 to 1963.

Judy Devlin is the third most successful player ever in the All England Badminton Championships, with 17 titles, 10 of them in women's singles and 7 in women's doubles.

She appeared as a castaway on the BBC Radio programme Desert Island Discs on 21 March 1970, and was inducted into the Badminton Hall of Fame in 1997, together with her father. She has also been inducted into the U. S. Badminton Hall of Fame and the International Women's Sports Hall of Fame.

Achievements

European Championships

Record at the All England Championships

Other International tournaments

References

External links 
 Goucher College Athletics Hall of Fame
USA Badminton Walk of Fame Plaza: Judy Devlin Hashman
Sports Biographies – Devlin, Judy (Mrs. Hashman)

1935 births
Living people
American female badminton players
English female badminton players
Goucher College alumni
Sportspeople from Winnipeg
21st-century American women